State Route 159 (abbreviated SR 159) is part of Maine's system of numbered state highways, located in Penobscot and Aroostook counties.

SR 159 is signed as an east–west highway, but has a roughly L-shaped alignment.

Route description
Route logs do not indicate a specific intersection for the terminus, which is located between the intersections of Black Point Road and Grand Lake / Snowshoe Roads.

The highway proceeds almost due south and slightly east through Mt. Chase, then enters the town of Patten.  SR 156 turns due east and intersects with SR 11 in the town center.  The two routes overlap briefly before SR 159 continues east along a slightly meandering route towards Island Falls.  Crossing into Island Falls, SR 159 interchanges with Interstate 95 at exit 276 before terminating at US 2 in the town center.

History
SR 159 was originally designated in 1925 and ran between SR 11 in Patten and US 2 in Island Falls. In 1949, it was extended northwest to its current western terminus.

Junction list

References

External links

159
Transportation in Penobscot County, Maine
Transportation in Aroostook County, Maine